The Algonquin Apartments were a historic site in Miami, Florida. They were located at 1819-1825 Biscayne Boulevard. On January 4, 1989, they were added to the U.S. National Register of Historic Places, but then they were demolished. They were delisted in 2018.

References

External links
 Dade County listings at Florida's Office of Cultural and Historical Programs

Apartment buildings in Miami
National Register of Historic Places in Miami
Former National Register of Historic Places in Florida